Asians in the Americas may refer to:

Prehistoric migration
 Prehistoric migration and settlement of the Americas from Asia

Recent migration (c. 1700 CE to present)
Asian Americans (United States)
Asian Hispanic and Latino Americans
Central Asian Americans 
East Asian Americans 
Middle Eastern Americans (includes West Asians)
South Asian Americans 
Southeast Asian Americans 
Asian Canadians
East Asian Canadians
South Asian Canadians
West Asian Canadians
Asian Caribbean
Chinese Caribbean
Dougla
Indo-Caribbean
Marabou
Japanese Caribbean
Asian Latin Americans
Asian Argentine
Asian Brazilian
Asian Mexican
Asian Peruvian
Asian Surinamese